Inside Deep Throat is a 2005 American documentary film about the 1972 pornographic film Deep Throat, at the forefront of the Golden Age of Porn, and its effects on American society.

Content 
The film discusses how Deep Throat was distributed to theaters when prints would be hand-delivered and employees would count heads of moviegoers and then collect the cash profits from the theaters. This process was known as sending "checkers and sweepers".

It features scenes from the film, news of the time and interviews, both from archive and recent footage, with director Gerard Damiano, actor Harry Reems, actress Linda Lovelace, Gore Vidal, Larry Flynt, Hugh Hefner, John Waters, Erica Jong, a prosecutor, Reems' defense, Mafia money collectors, and other people involved or just commenting on the film. Much of the material was compiled from approximately 800 hours of interview and archive footage collected by the filmmakers.

Cast
 Dennis Hopper
 John Waters
 Hugh Hefner
 Larry Flynt
 Annie Sprinkle
 Gore Vidal
 Gerard Damiano
 Dick Cavett
 Wes Craven
 Bill Maher
 Harry Reems
 David Winters
 Norman Mailer
 Erica Jong
 Catharine MacKinnon
 Camille Paglia
 Tony Bill
 Dr. Ruth Westheimer (Dr. Ruth)

Archive footage
 Linda Lovelace
 Francis Ford Coppola
 Warren Beatty
 Johnny Carson
 Bob Hope
 Jack Nicholson
 Gloria Steinem
 New York City Mayor John Lindsay

Production 
Narrated by Dennis Hopper, the documentary was written, produced, and directed by Fenton Bailey and Randy Barbato, and produced by Brian Grazer. It is a production of Imagine Entertainment, HBO Documentary Films, and World of Wonder, and distributed by Universal Pictures.

Rating
Inside Deep Throat was rated NC-17 by the Motion Picture Association of America for explicit sexual content; specifically, explicit excerpts from the original film. It was the first film rated NC-17 to be released by Universal since Henry & June in 1990, which was the first film to receive the NC-17 rating.

An edited version received an R rating for "strong sexuality including graphic images, nudity and dialogue".

References

External links
 
 
 
 
 
 
 Inside Deep Throat at AdultDVDTalk
 Film critic Anthony Lane of The New Yorker discusses the pros and cons of the sexuality debate that has ensued from the production of Deep Throat and Inside Deep Throat

2005 films
2005 documentary films
American documentary films
2000s English-language films
Documentary films about films
Documentary films about American pornography
Films about freedom of expression
American independent films
Sexuality and society
Films produced by Brian Grazer
Universal Pictures films
Imagine Entertainment films
World of Wonder (company) films
Films directed by Randy Barbato
Films directed by Fenton Bailey
2000s American films